The 1996 British Formula Two Championship was the seventh season of the British Formula 3000 Championship. The championship was dominated by the Super Nova car of Gareth Rees, the former Marlboro Masters F3 winner who competed in International Formula 3000 the previous year. He won six races and clinched the title with two rounds to go.

Rees started the season in style, winning the first 5 races, but stumbled at Donington when Sascha Maassen took his only victory of the year. Werner Lupberger won the following round as Rees retired, but Gareth won the Silverstone round to tie up the championship. Luiz Garcia Jr. won the remaining two rounds after battling with Lupberger and Gonzalo Rodriguez, securing second in the standings. Lupberger ended up third, one place ahead of Rodriguez. British Formula Renault champion David Cook raced twice in Rees' absence, while future International F3000 star Jason Watt made his F3000 debut for Fred Goddard Racing in the final round. Ex-Andrea Moda F1 non-qualifier Perry McCarthy made a single seater return with DKS Racing. The future boss of International F3000 team Arden, Christian Horner, finished fifth overall after half a season with veteran team Madgwick International. Sarah Kavanagh, future Formula Nippon and BOSS Formula 1 driver, raced on a couple of occasions in a Sainsbury's and Parmalat backed Fred Goddard Racing entry.

Several talented drivers entered British F2 in 1996, but at times grids had declined to just five cars, the smallest in the series' history, and teams withdrew their support. British F2 was finally dead.

Drivers and teams
The following drivers and teams contested the 1996 British Formula Two Championship. All teams ran a Reynard chassis with Cosworth engine.

Results

British Formula Two Championship

Championship Standings

References

Formula 3000
British Formula 3000 Championship
British Formula 2